Yan Ng Yat-Yin (Chinese:吳日言|s=吴日言|first=t) (born 25 November 1983) is a Hong Kong Cantopop singer and actress.

Filmography
My Sweetie (2004)
Moments of Love (2005)
The Unusual Youth (2005)
It Had to Be You! (2005)
AV (2005)
Crazy n' the City (2005)
Whispers and Moans (2007)
Dancing Lion (2007)
Naraka 19 (2007)
Love Is Elsewhere (2008)
Hidden Faces (2015)
Happiness (2016)

External links
 Yan Ng at HKMDB.com
 
 HK Cinemagic entry

1983 births
Living people
Cantopop singer-songwriters
21st-century Hong Kong actresses
21st-century Hong Kong women singers
Hong Kong Mandopop singers